Caroline Anne Phillips is a New Zealand archaeologist. She has lectured at the University of Auckland and Te Whare Wananga o Awanuiarangi.

Life 
Phillips began her career in archaeology as a fieldworker, working on surveys and excavations. Much of her work was on Māori sites. In 1987 she completed a master's degree at the University of Auckland on the Karikari Peninsula, in the far north of New Zealand. In 1994 she completed a doctoral degree from the same university, studying Māori settlements on the Waihou River.

Publications 

 Waihou Journeys: The Archaeology of 400 Years of Maori Settlement (Auckland University Press, 2000)
 Bridging the Divide: Indigenous Communities and Archaeology into the 21st Century (co-editor; 2010)
 Archaeology at Opita: Three Hundred Years of Continuity and Change (co-author, 2013)

References

Living people
Academic staff of the University of Auckland
Academic staff of Te Whare Wānanga o Awanuiārangi
University of Auckland alumni
New Zealand archaeologists
Year of birth missing (living people)
New Zealand women archaeologists